Émile Masson Jr. (1 September 1915 – 2 January 2011) was a Belgian professional road bicycle racer.

He was born in Hollogne-aux-Pierres, the son of former cyclist Émile Masson Sr. Masson was Belgian road race champion twice, and won important races such as La Flèche Wallonne, Paris–Roubaix and Bordeaux–Paris.

He died on 2 January 2011 at the age of 95.

Major results

1937
Koersel
1938
La Flèche Wallonne
Brussel-Hozémont
Tour de France:
Winner stage 17A
1939
Paris–Roubaix
Stal-Koersel
1946
 Belgian National Road Race Championships
Bordeaux–Paris
1947
 Belgian National Road Race Championships
1949
Liège-St. Hubert
1950
Liège

References

External links 

Official Tour de France results for Émile Masson Jr.

1915 births
2011 deaths
People from Grâce-Hollogne
Belgian male cyclists
Belgian Tour de France stage winners
Cyclists from Liège Province